Air Wales was an airline based at Cardiff International Airport in Rhoose, Vale of Glamorgan. It operated scheduled regional services within the United Kingdom, as well as to Ireland, Belgium and France. On 23 April 2006, Air Wales ceased all operations, citing "spiralling costs" and "aggressive competition" from larger low-cost airlines.

History
Air Wales was established in January 1997 with the assistance of property financier Roy Thomas and started operations in January 2000. Initially based at Pembrey Airport in west Wales and operating two Dornier 228 aircraft, Air Wales expanded to employ over 120 personnel, including 45 flight deck staff, 20 engineers and 20 cabin crew.

Operations transferred to Red Dragon House at the grounds of Swansea Airport, Fairwood Common, in October 2001. Passenger numbers failed to reach the company's break-even levels and, after three years, Air Wales gave up all its Swansea routes. The airline decided to concentrate on routes out of Cardiff, moving operations to a new headquarters at Cardiff International Airport in October 2004.

In December 2005, bmibaby and Air Wales had a fallout leaving bmibaby to cancel a partnership between the two airlines. The partnership covered the routes Belfast and Glasgow which were operated by Air Wales.

During February 2006, Air Wales gave up all routes from Plymouth Airport to focus on more popular routes and international routes.

On 23 April 2006, the airline ceased all scheduled services with a loss of 80 jobs to focus on charter and cargo operations, however these operations never materialised and the aircraft were all sold to other airlines.

Services
Air Wales operated the following services (in February 2006), which had all ceased by the end of April 2006:

Cardiff
Brussels, Aberdeen, Paris-CDG (on behalf of bmibaby), Belfast-City, Cork, Dublin, Jersey, Newcastle, Liverpool, London-City, Swansea, Plymouth

Cork
Cardiff, Exeter

Exeter
Cork

Swansea
Cork, Dublin, London-City, Amsterdam, Jersey, Cardiff

Terminated destinations

Air Wales served 20 destinations across Europe.

Partnership with bmibaby
Air Wales had a partnership with bmibaby to operate on the following routes:

Paris, France
Cork, Ireland
Belfast, Northern Ireland [suspended in March 2006]
Jersey
Glasgow, Scotland [suspended in March 2006]

Fleet

Air Wales originally operated Dornier 228 aircraft. These were replaced by a fleet of ATR-42-300 aircraft:

In March 2006, Air Wales fleet average age was 13.4 years.

See also
 List of defunct airlines of the United Kingdom

References

External links

Air Wales (Archive)
Air Wales Photos

Airlines established in 1997
Airlines disestablished in 2006
1997 establishments in Wales
2006 disestablishments in Wales
Defunct airlines of the United Kingdom
Defunct European low-cost airlines
Aviation in Wales